Ozmana is a genus of crustaceans belonging to the monotypic family Ozmanidae.

The species of this genus are found in Southern America.

Species:

Ozmana haemophila 
Ozmana huarpium

References

Crustaceans